Jamie Kellner is an American former television executive. He was chairman and chief executive officer of Turner Broadcasting System, Inc., a division of Time Warner which includes TBS, TNT, and Cartoon Network. Kellner took over the post in 2001 and handed over the company to Phil Kent in 2003. He was the chairman of station ownership group ACME Communications, a post held from the company's founding until its folding in 2016.

Early life and education
Kellner was born to an Irish Catholic family in Brooklyn and grew up on Long Island, New York.

Career

After college he participated in the CBS Executive Training Program and after CBS disposed of its syndication division, he rose to the rank of vice president for first-run programming, development, and sales at Viacom. In 1978, he accepted a job as executive of Filmways, a film and television producer and distributor.

In 1982, after Filmways was taken over by Orion Pictures, he served as president of its Orion Entertainment Group, where he oversaw and supervised their programming and syndication activities including the launch of Cagney and Lacey. In 1986, he was the first executive hired by Rupert Murdoch and Barry Diller to develop a fourth television network to compete with the big three. At Fox, he was charged with building the affiliate network, selling programming to advertisers, and the establishment of relations with program producers.

Fox Broadcasting Company
Kellner was present at the creation of the Fox Broadcasting Company. Among the shows that emerged during Kellner's seven years at Fox were The Simpsons, Married... with Children, Beverly Hills, 90210, Melrose Place and In Living Color. Those shows held the fledgling "web" together until Fox shocked the television world by winning partial rights to the National Football League in 1994 from CBS; that, as well as channel upgrades in many markets due to Fox's alliance and merger with New World Communications, made Fox a legitimate fourth network.

WB Television Network
Kellner then spent seven years at the helm of the WB Television Network. He helped launch the new broadcast network in 1994. During his tenure, Kellner began by championing urban sitcoms, but eventually steered the network in the direction of teen and family-oriented dramas. 7th Heaven, Buffy the Vampire Slayer, Gilmore Girls, Dawson's Creek, Felicity and Charmed all premiered during Kellner's presidency.

Head of Turner Broadcasting System
Kellner was made head of Turner Broadcasting System in 2000. He was ultimately the one who made the decision to cancel World Championship Wrestling (WCW) programming on Turner's networks in 2001. The once-powerful WCW was the largest wrestling promotion in the world popularity-wise in the mid-1990s, besting its rival World Wrestling Federation (WWF, now known as the WWE) head-to-head on Monday nights for 83 consecutive weeks. By 2001, it was declining, and lost roughly $60 million the previous year. A combination of resurgent competition from WWF, as well as many bad booking and financial decisions had all but killed WCW's fanbase and profitability. With WCW no longer being financially viable, and AOL Time Warner wanting nothing to do with the product further (desiring to move in a different direction), Kellner canceled all WCW programming on TBS and TNT. This left WCW without a television contract, and hastened its eventual purchase of assets by WWF chairman Vince McMahon.

In the book The Death of WCW by Bryan Alvarez and RD Reynolds, Kellner is listed as the official "killer" of WCW, insofar as he made the official call to remove it from Turner Networks. In the book NITRO: The Incredible Rise and Inevitable Collapse of Ted Turner's WCW by Guy Evans, it is said that a key condition in WCW's purchase deal with Fusient Media Ventures was that Fusient wanted control over time slots on TNT and TBS networks, regardless of whether these slots would show WCW programming or not. This influenced Kellner's decision to ultimately cancel WCW programming. WCW's losses were then written-off via purchase accounting; according to Evans: "in the post-merger environment, the new conglomerate was able to 'write down' money losing operations, essentially eliminating those losses because of their irrelevancy moving forward."

Personal life
Kellner and his wife, Julie, have one child, and he also has a daughter from his previous marriage.

References

Sources
The Death of WCW, by R.D. Reynolds and Bryan Alvarez. New York: ECW Press (not related to Extreme Championship Wrestling), 2005; 

American television executives
American television company founders
Living people
Year of birth missing (living people)
LIU Post alumni
Warner Bros. Discovery people
Warner Bros. people
The WB executives
Fox Broadcasting Company executives
People from Brooklyn
Businesspeople from New York City
People from Long Island
World Championship Wrestling executives